Carl Marvin Meinhold (March 29, 1926 – February 23, 2019) was an American professional basketball player.

Early life 
A 6'2" guard/forward from Long Island University, Meinhold played two seasons (1947–1949) in the Basketball Association of America as a member of the Baltimore Bullets, Providence Steamrollers and Chicago Stags, He averaged 5.3 points per game in his BAA career and won a league championship with Baltimore in 1948. In 1953-54 he played for the Washington Generals, a team which toured with (and generally lost to) the Harlem Globetrotters. Meinhold was named to the all-league first team while playing for the Berwick Carbuilders of the Eastern Professional Basketball League in 1954.

Meinhold attended Hazleton High School in Hazleton, Pennsylvania, where in 1944 he led the team to a Pennsylvania state title, scoring 25 points in the final.

BAA career statistics

Regular season

Playoffs

References

External links

1926 births
2019 deaths
American men's basketball players
Baltimore Bullets (1944–1954) players
Basketball players from Pennsylvania
Chicago Stags players
LIU Brooklyn Blackbirds men's basketball players
People from Hazleton, Pennsylvania
Providence Steamrollers players
Shooting guards
Small forwards
Washington Generals players